The Skelton Viaduct, also known as the Hook bridge or Goole railway swing bridge, is a large viaducted hogback plate girder bridge with swing span over the River Ouse, Yorkshire near Goole, East Riding of Yorkshire, England. The bridge was designed by Thomas Elliot Harrison for the Hull and Doncaster Branch of the North Eastern Railway and opened in 1869.

In the latter part of the 20th century, the bridge became known for the frequent incidents involving ship collisions with the superstructure. As of 2022, it is still in use.

History and description

During the 1860s, a number of attempts were made by different railway companies to create a new line better connecting Kingston upon Hull and South Yorkshire; in 1862 the North Eastern Railway promoted a bill for a line which was unopposed by the Manchester, Sheffield & Lincolnshire Railway, and Lancashire & Yorkshire Railway on the understanding of mutual running powers for the companies, either to Hull, or on lines in South Yorkshire. The bill, the "North Eastern Railway (Hull and Doncaster Branch)" was deposited  late 1862, for a line from a junction on the Hull and Selby Line near  Staddlethorpe (near Gilberdyke) to a junction with the South Yorkshire Railway near Thorne, Hatfield and Stainforth. The act was passed in mid-1863.

As part of the construction of the line, a bridge was required over the River Ouse near Goole between Skelton and Hook.

Construction and design

The bridge consisted of four fixed spans, one swing span and a fifth swing span, and carried a double-track railway.

The piers were sunk into the river alluvium using a mass placed on them, and then by the pneumatic Caisson process until bedrock was reached. The tubes were then filled with Portland cement concrete to within  of the top, the final fill was with brickwork with a top course of granite. The river abutments were of brick with stone dressing.

In addition to the transverse deck girders the swing span was also braced by three transverse frames, which also served to support a bridgeman's hut over the centre of the bridge.

The bridge was turned by a three-cylinder hydraulic motor (duplicated for redundancy), and gears. The accumulator was charged by  steam engines, also duplicated. The engines were supplied by field boilers also located on the central pier.

When in the closed position a hydraulic mechanism at either end of the bridge was used to lock the bridge in position. The bridge could be opened in 50 seconds.

The bridge superstructure was designed was T. E. Harrison of the NER, and erected by Pease, Hutchinson and Company (Skerne Ironworks). The fixed spans were supplied by Butler and Pitts (Stanningley), the hydraulic motors were of the design of Sir W.G. Armstrong.

The bridge was crossed by NER officials in 1868, and the line opened on 2 August 1869.

Working history

On 21 March 1922, the river pier and engine room of the swing span was badly damaged by fire.

In May 1933, the LNER had a miniature thumb switch controlled signalling frame installed at the bridge by Westinghouse, at the same time the line from Staddlethorpe to Goole had colour light signalling installed; both were early examples of either technology in use. At the same time, two signal boxes at either end of the bridge were closed.

The bridge has had several collisions with water-going ships.

On 21 December 1973, the bridge was struck by a German coaster (Vineta ), causing one of the spans to fall into the river, leaving the bridge unworkable for nine months.

On 2 August 1976, Danish vessel Leon Sif hit one of the bridge's piers.

British Rail began closure procedures for the railway line due to costs associated repairing the bridge's pier, estimated at £2 million, coupled with a historic failure to get adequate compensation for damage to the bridge caused by shipping.

In 1987, the structure was given a grade II* listing by English Heritage.

On 23 November 1988, one of the fixed spans was pushed out of alignment by a collision with the Swedish vessel Samo, which became trapped between the bridge's piers.

In 2009, a modernisation programme began – Clancy Docwra installed services (telecoms, fresh and waste water, electricity, signalling) to the central pier through piping under the river bed. Carillion was appointed main contractor in March 2010. The bridge steelwork was repaired and upgraded over a six-week line closure starting in October 2010 – over 400 tonnes of steelwork was installed including diagonal transverse braces, and stiffening to the girders of the web. Additional work included track renewal and painting of the bridge. The total cost of the project was £6 million; the firm of Pell Frischmann was the designing engineer.

See also
Similar bridges
Naburn swing bridge (York and Doncaster Line)
Selby swing bridge (1891) (Hull and Selby Line)

Notes

References

Sources
 , Plates: 17-24

Literature

External links

 , SAMO stuck under Ouse bridge, 1988
 , gallery of 2010 improvement works

Bridges across the River Ouse, Yorkshire
North Eastern Railway (UK)
Swing bridges in England
Goole
Grade II* listed railway bridges and viaducts